Wermund, Vermund or Garmund is an ancestor of the Mercian royal family, a son of Wihtlaeg and father of Offa. The Anglo-Saxon Chronicle makes him a grandson of Woden, but the Gesta Danorum written by Saxo Grammaticus goes no further than his father, while the Brevis Historia Regum Dacie of Sven Aggesen makes Wermund son of king Frothi hin Frokni.

According to the Gesta Danorum, his reign was long and happy, though its prosperity was eventually marred by the raids of a warlike king named Athislus, who slew Frowinus, the governor of Schleswig, in battle. Frowinus's death was avenged by his two sons, Keto and Wigo, but their conduct in fighting together against a single man was thought to constitute a national disgrace, which was only reconciled by the subsequent single combat of Offa.

It has been suggested that Athislus, though called king of the Swedes by Saxo, was really identical with the Eadgils, king of the Myrgings, mentioned in Widsith,  and Frowinus and Wigo are    identified with the Freawine and Wig who figure among the ancestors of the kings of Wessex in the Anglo-Saxon royal genealogies. As Eadgils was a contemporary of Ermanaric, who died about 376, his date would agree with the indication given by the genealogies which place Wermund nine generations before Penda of Mercia.

He is mentioned in lines 1958-1963 of the Anglo-Saxon epic Beowulf as Garmund the father of Offa of Angel and grandfather of Eomer.

References

External links
Transcript of Saxo's Danish History. - See Chapter 4 for description of Wermund.

Mythological kings of Denmark
Anglish warriors